Alfred Anthony Anderson (born August 4, 1961) is a former professional American football player who played running back for eight seasons for the Minnesota Vikings. He also attended Baylor.

College statistics
1980: 64 carries for 293 yards and 9 TD. 2 catches for 23 yards.
1981: 60 carries for 251 yards and 8 TD. 14 catches for 201 yards. 1 kick return for 12 yards.
1982: 201 carries for 837 yards and 8 TD. 17 catches for 206 yards and one touchdown.
1983: 231 carries for 1046 yards and 10 TD. 9 catches for 113 yards.

NFL career statistics

References

External links
NFL.com player page

1961 births
Living people
Sportspeople from Waco, Texas
American football running backs
Baylor Bears football players
Minnesota Vikings players